Trarego Viggiona is a comune (municipality) in the Province of Verbano-Cusio-Ossola in the Italian region Piedmont, located about  northeast of Turin and about  north of Verbania.

The municipality of Trarego Viggiona contains the frazioni (subdivisions, mainly villages and hamlets) Viggiona and Cheglio.

Trarego Viggiona borders the following municipalities: Aurano, Cannero Riviera, Cannobio, Oggebbio, Valle Cannobina.

Demographic evolution

References

Cities and towns in Piedmont